Vakula Mahadevi, was the queen regnant of the Indian  Bhauma-Kara dynasty's Kingdom of Toshala in cirka 936-940.  

She was born a princess of the Bhanj dynasty. She was married to Subhakaradeva V. Her spouse was first succeeded by his other widow Gauri Mahadevi, and then by their daughter Dandi Mahadevi.   

In 936, her stepdaughter queen Dandi Mahadevi died in childbirth. Vakula Mahadevi succeeded her on the throne. Very little is known about her reign. She is known to have made a donation of a village in Uttara Tosali. Her reign demonstrate the introduction of the Bhanj dynasty in the affair of the kingdom. 

She was succeeded by queen Dharma Mahadevi, her husband's sister-in-law.

References 

 Archana Garodia Gupta, The Women Who Ruled India: Leaders. Warriors. Icons.

10th-century women rulers
10th-century Indian monarchs
10th-century Indian women
10th-century Indian people